Fade Files is a Welsh electronic pop group based in Cardiff, Wales. Its members are Richard Griffiths (from Cardiff), Stefan Schmid (from Fribourg, Switzerland) and producer Mark Hopgood, from London. The group started in 2012 when Richard and Stefan began to demo songs together in Switzerland and Wales. Inspired initially by The Postal Service’s method of working from different parts of the country, their collaboration continued over the Internet. Mark joined in 2014, and the group writes and produces their music together in Switzerland, London or Wales, or sometimes by swapping files online. Their first single "Byth yn Dod Lawr" was produced in collaboration with Kris Jenkins.

History

2016: Single - Byth Yn Dod Lawr
Release date: 17 May 2016

A Side - Byth Yn Dod Lawr

B Side - Let It Come Down (free download)

Byth Yn Dod Lawr was awarded "Trac Yr Wythnos" ( track of the week ) by BBC Radio Cymru on the week commencing 6 June 2016.
Link: BBC Radio Cymru Playlist

Members

Current members
Richard Griffiths: Vocals, keyboards
Mark Hopgood: Keyboards, harmonies
Stefan Schmid: Vocals, keyboards

Occasional additional members
Andy Taylor: Guitars
Oncle Gilbert: Samples
David K. West: Muse

Discography
2016

 Byth Yn Dod Lawr (single) | BYDL (May 2016) Byth Yn Dod Lawr - YouTube
 Let It Come Down (B-Side to BYDL) (May 2016) Let It Come Down (for David K. West) - YouTube
 Am Y Gorwel (single) | AYG (September 2016)
 Drysau Cudd (B-Side to AYG) (September 2016)

References

External links
 
 Fade Files Artist Page on Spotify

Welsh alternative rock groups
Dream pop musical groups
Welsh-language bands
British electronic music groups
Welsh-speaking musicians